In the Scottish church of the 18th and 19th centuries, a burgher was a member of that party amongst the seceders which asserted the lawfulness of the burgess oath.

The burgess oath was that oath a town burgess was required to swear on taking office. The secession church in Scotland split in 1747 into the Burghers and the Anti-Burghers over the lawfulness of the forms of the oath then current in Scotland, the contentious clause being that in which the burgess professed the true religion professed within the realm. According to Dale Jorgenson, "...The Patronage Act, enacted under the reign of Queen Anne (1702-14), gave lay patrons the right to present ministers to parishes. This act of patronage was an affront to classic Presbyterianism, and resulted in a division between Burghers who accepted the Burghers' Oath and its consequent patronage, and the Anti-Burghers who would not accept the oath."

Notable Burghers
Robert Balmer ('New Licht' - subsequently Professor of Theology of the United Secession Church)
John Brown of Haddington (ordained after the 1747 'Breach' and died before the 'Auld Licht'/'New Licht' division), Professor of Theology of the Associate Presbytery
John Dick, 'New Licht' Professor of Theology of the Associate Presbytery 
Ebenezer Erskine (one of the 1733 seceders) (died before the 'Auld Licht'/'New Licht' division)
Ralph Erskine (seceded 1737) (died before the 'Auld Licht'/'New Licht' division)
James Fisher (one of the 1733 seceders) (died before the 'Auld Licht'/'New Licht' division)
George Lawson (1749–1820), 'New Licht' Professor of Theology of the Associate Presbytery 
Michael Willis 'Auld Licht' Professor of Theology, son of the next
William Willis, 'Auld Licht' Professor of Theology, father of the previous

Theological Professors

Before the 'Auld Licht'/'New Licht' division (1747-1800)

1. James Fisher (1749-1764)

2. John Swanston (1764-1767)

3. John Brown of Haddington (1768-1787)

4. George Lawson (1787-1800)

New Light (1800-1820)

1. George Lawson (1800-1820)

2. John Dick (1820)

Old Light (1800-1839) 

1. William Willis (1800-1803)

2. George Hill (1803-1819)

3. William Taylor (appointed interim Professor, 1818) (1819-1833) (died 1836)

4. Michael Willis (1835-1839)

References
Citations

Sources
 

Presbyterianism in Scotland
Schisms in Christianity
History of the Church of Scotland
18th century in Scotland
19th century in Scotland
18th-century Calvinism
19th-century Calvinism
Church of Scotland